Sakhavu (English: Comrade) is a 2017 Indian Malayalam-language political drama film written and directed by Sidhartha Siva. It stars Nivin Pauly in dual roles, as a cunning student political leader (Krishnakumar) and a senior social activist and comrade (Sakhavu Krishnan) who fights for his left-wing ideals. Aishwarya Rajesh plays the heroine. The film was released on 14 April 2017 during Vishu holiday to positive reviews.

Plot
Krishnakumar aka Kichu is a ruthless youth wing's leader at a district level of his political party. He plans to get into a better position at his SFK party by destroying the political career of other competitors in his party. He arranges people to beat up his competitor, even though he is Kichu's close friend.

He gets a call from Kuriachan who is a leader of his political party. He tells Kichu to go to hospital and donate blood for a comrade as Kichu has the rare blood group O Negative. Kichu was forced to go to hospital but he tells his friend Mahesh that he will get the hell out of there without wasting his time. He makes a lot of mess at hospital and tells the acquaintance of the recipient to get food for him. Kichu was thinking that the recipient was a less known comrade but he was stunned by seeing even the chief minister paying a visit to see the wounded recipient. Now Kichu is eager to know about this so-called comrade and asks Prabhakaran (an acquaintance of comrade) about him.

Prabhakaran starts to tell the story of comrade Krishnan, the patient. Krishnan was a party member who was sent to Peerumedu by party's Kottayam district committee to develop their party's influence there. Krishnan raised voice against the poor wage giving to workers at tea estate but the manager of the estate was not interested in raising the wage. Krishnan led a strike with all the workers and the tea factory was forced to raise the wage. Krishnan's next move was against a Brahmin landlord. The landlord was giving labour to Tamil people for poor wage instead of malayalees. Krishnan and his party talked to the landlord but he didn't negotiate. And the landlord didn't do the cultivation that year. Krishnan and workers started cultivating in the landlord's land and produced a good yield. They were ready to give the yield to the landlord at a condition that he should give them the proper wage. He was forced to accept.

Krishnan gave word to comrade Janaki's family that he would marry her. They got married after some events. After some years Krishnan had a stroke and got into partial paralysis. Then he learned that the old factory where they did their first strike was closed and workers are in poverty. Krishnan visited a rich man who had got many helps from him and asked him if he can buy that estate and start the factory. He accepted it at a request that Krishnan should be one among in the governing body of the factory. Krishnan accepted this and later learned that a young man Tony had captured some of the land in the estate. Krishnan ordered him to get his resort closed. Tony stabbed Krishnan at night to retain his resort and that's the story of Krishnan.

Kichu now learns that the way he is living is not the way a comrade should live. Krishnan's surgery was successful and all of them in the hospital was happy. Kichu hesitated to see Krishnan's face as he had cherished his personality in his heart.
Kichu goes to peerumedu with his youth wing comrades and beats up Tony who stabbed Krishnan and he proclaims that Krishnan's legacy will be continued through them.

Cast

 Nivin Pauly as Sakhavu Krishnan & Krishnakumar (Dual role)
 Aishwarya Rajesh as Sakhavu Janaki
 Aparna Gopinath as Neethi
 Sreenivasan as Doctor
 Gayathri Suresh as Aishwarya
 Binu Pappu as Retired DYSP Prabhakaran Eeraali
 Althaf Salim as Mahesh
 Renji Panicker as Sakhavu Kuriyachan
 Maniyanpilla Raju as Rajan, Assistant Labour Officer
 Baiju as Garuda Kankaani
 Sudheesh as Sakhavu Daasan
 Premkumar as Party Secretary
 Rakendhu Kumar as Sakhavu Eldho
 Santhosh Keezhattoor as Sakhavu Senthil
 Musthafa as Sakhavu Basheer
 V. K. Prakash as Mathew
 Nishanth Sagar as Tony Manakkal
 Tony Luke Kocherry as 'The Manager'
 P. Balachandran as Kavalam Pattaru
 Sooraj S. Kurup as Rajeev
 Sreelakshmi as Krishnakumar's mother
 V. Suresh Thampanoor as Janaki's father
 Seema G Nair as Janaki's mother
 Shelly Kishore as Maya
 Anjali Aneesh as Suja
 Aliyar as Sakhavu Baskaran
 Baiju V.K. as Special Police Officer
 Reshmi Boban as Headmistress
 Krishna Prasad as Advocate
 Chali Pala as Sub Inspector
 Kalabhavan Rahman as Thattukada o wner
 Appunni Sasi as Waiter

Box office
The film collected  on day-1 in Kerala box office. The film collected 9.95 lakhs from US box office and 6.94 lakhs from UK box office in its two weekends. The film grossed $196,175 from UAE box office in its two weekends. The Movie was a super hit at the box office.

References

2017 films
2010s Malayalam-language films
Indian political drama films
Films about landlords
Films directed by Sidhartha Siva